The Donnersbergkreis is a district (Kreis) in the middle of Rhineland-Palatinate, Germany. Neighboring districts are Bad Kreuznach, Alzey-Worms, Bad Dürkheim, Kaiserslautern, Kusel.

History
The district was created in 1969 by merging the districts Kirchheimbolanden and Rockenhausen.

Geography
The district is located around the highest mountain of the Palatinate, the Donnersberg with 687 m above sea level.

Coat of arms
Both of the districts merged into the Donnersbergkreis had a wheel in their coat of arms, which are now also shown in the coat of arms of the new district. On the left is the red wheel of the Lords of Bolanden, taken from the Kirchheim coat of arms. The blue wheel on the right is the wheel of the Lords of Falkenstein, taken from the Rockenhausen coat of arms. The green field on the bottom with the peak symbolizes the Donnersberg, the highest elevation in the district, and the sun the importance of the sunny plains for viticulture.

Towns and municipalities
{|
! colspan=5|Verbandsgemeinden
|- valign=top
||
1. Eisenberg
 Eisenberg1, 2
 Kerzenheim
 Ramsen
2. Göllheim
 Albisheim
 Biedesheim
 Bubenheim
 Dreisen
 Einselthum
 Göllheim1
 Immesheim
 Lautersheim
 Ottersheim
 Rüssingen
 Standenbühl
 Weitersweiler
 Zellertal
||
3. Kirchheimbolanden
 Bennhausen
 Bischheim
 Bolanden
 Dannenfels
 Gauersheim
 Ilbesheim
 Jakobsweiler
 Kirchheimbolanden1, 2
 Kriegsfeld
 Marnheim
 Mörsfeld
 Morschheim
 Oberwiesen
 Orbis
 Rittersheim
 Stetten
||
4. Nordpfälzer Land
 Alsenz
 Bayerfeld-Steckweiler
 Bisterschied
 Dielkirchen
 Dörrmoschel
 Finkenbach-Gersweiler
 Gaugrehweiler
 Gehrweiler
 Gerbach
 Gundersweiler
 Imsweiler
 Kalkofen
 Katzenbach
 Mannweiler-Cölln
 Münsterappel
 Niederhausen an der Appel
 Niedermoschel
 Oberhausen an der Appel
||

 Obermoschel2
 Oberndorf
 Ransweiler
 Rathskirchen
 Reichsthal
 Rockenhausen1, 2
 Ruppertsecken
 Sankt Alban
 Schiersfeld
 Schönborn
 Seelen
 Sitters
 Stahlberg
 Teschenmoschel
 Unkenbach
 Waldgrehweiler
 Winterborn
 Würzweiler
||
5. Winnweiler
 Börrstadt
 Breunigweiler
 Falkenstein
 Gonbach
 Höringen
 Imsbach
 Lohnsfeld
 Münchweiler an der Alsenz
 Schweisweiler
 Sippersfeld
 Steinbach am Donnersberg
 Wartenberg-Rohrbach
 Winnweiler1
|-
|colspan=5 align=center|1seat of the Verbandsgemeinde; 2town
|}

References

External links

Official website (German)
Touristic website (German)

 
Districts of Rhineland-Palatinate
North Palatinate